Mr. Wonderful may refer to:

Music
"Mr. Wonderful", a song by Samiyam featuring Action Bronson, 2016
Mr. Wonderful (Action Bronson album), 2015
Mr. Wonderful (Fleetwood Mac album), 1968
Mr. Wonderful (Johnny "Hammond" Smith album), 1963
"Mr. Wonderful", a 1999 single by Smile.dk
Mr. Wonderful (musical), starring Sammy Davis, Jr.
"Mr. Wonderful" (1955 song), the title song from the musical

Films 
Mr. Wonderful (film), a 1993 film directed by Anthony Minghella

Comics 
Mister Wonderful (comics), an American comic strip written and illustrated by Daniel Clowes
"Mr. Wonderful", alternate name for Mister Mind, Fawcett Comics character

People 
"Mr. Wonderful", ring name of Paul Orndorff (1949–2021),  American wrestler
Phil Davis (fighter) (born 1984), American mixed martial artist and collegiate wrestler
"Mr. Wonderful", nickname of Kevin O'Leary, Canadian businessman, investor, television personality

See also
 Miss Wonderful, 1959 Peggy Lee album